Leo Senior (1887−1975) was an Australian rugby league footballer who played in the 1900s. He played four matches for South Sydney in the New South Wales Rugby League Premiership in his career and scored three tries in the same year. He is most credited  for scoring the first try in an NSWRL/NRL Grand Final in the inaugural NSWRL Final in 1908. His try strike rate was 0.75 (3 from 4 top grade appearances) one of the highest in the league's  inaugural season.

Career statistics
Games:4

Tries:3

Goals:0

Field Goals:0

Position:Wing

Premierships:1

References

External links
 Leo Senior Rugby League Project
 Leo Senior AFL Tables

1887 births
1975 deaths
Australian rugby league players
South Sydney Rabbitohs players
Rugby league players from New South Wales
Rugby league wingers
Rugby league centres
People from Inverell